General elections were held in Sierra Leone on 25 May 1962, just over a year after the country gained independence from the United Kingdom. This was the first to be held under universal suffrage. The elections were won by the ruling Sierra Leone People's Party (SLPP), although the party received fewer votes than independent candidates. SLPP leader Milton Margai remained Prime Minister.

Campaign
A total of 216 candidates contested the 62 seats, of which seven were won unopposed; four by the SLPP, two by the All People's Congress (APC) and one by an independent one. The SLPP nominated 59 candidates, the APC 32 and the Sierra Leone Progressive Independence Movement and the United Progressive Party four each. The other 117 candidates were independents.

Results

References

Elections in Sierra Leone
Sierra Leone
1962 in Sierra Leone
Election and referendum articles with incomplete results
May 1962 events in Africa